Sultan Al-Enezi (born 29 September 1992) is a Kuwaiti footballer who plays for Al-Arabi mainly as a  defensive midfielder .

Career 
Al-Enezi made his debut for national team against Lebanon in 2013. He was selected for the national team squad to play in 2015 AFC Asian Cup.

References

External links 
 

1992 births
Living people
Kuwaiti footballers
Association football defenders
Kuwait international footballers
Al-Khor SC players
Al-Wakrah SC players
2015 AFC Asian Cup players
Sportspeople from Kuwait City
Qatar Stars League players
Qatari Second Division players
AFC Cup winning players
Qadsia SC players
Al-Arabi SC (Kuwait) players
Kuwait Premier League players
Kuwaiti expatriate sportspeople in Qatar
Expatriate footballers in Qatar
Kuwaiti expatriate footballers